Turris in Mauretania is an ancient settlement of Roman North Africa  in the Roman province of Mauretania Caesariensis. The location is unknown but believed to be in Algeria. The city was believed to be the site of an ancient bishopric but no bishops of antiquity are known to us. The suffix "in Mauretania" is to differentiate the town from cities that existed in Spain and adjoining provinces of Roman North Africa.

The diocese remains today a titular see of the Roman Catholic Church in the ecclesiastical province of Carthage.  The current titular bishop is Bishop Alain de Raemy, auxiliary bishop of Lausanne, Genève et Fribourg (Switzerland).

References

Former populated places in Algeria
Ancient Berber cities
Roman towns and cities in Algeria
Catholic titular sees in Africa